Starving the Vultures is the first studio album by Pittsburgh's Circle of Dead Children.

Track listing
 "Ursa Major" – 0:45
 "Eldorado" - 3:14
 "Where the Hive Hangs" – 3:10
 "Sunday's Agenda?" – 2:06
 "Tranquilizer" – 0:54
 "Four Walls and a Feeling" – 2:39
 "When Silence Glorifies Pestilence (Faint)" – 0:52	
 "Sons of Nameless" – 1:18
 "Doom Farmer" – 0:28
 "Calm" – 2:37
 "Freethinkers Fight Song" – 1:31
 "Return to Water" – 2:29
 "Heidi's Arrow" – 1:30
 "Imprint This Stake With Your Name" – 0:45

References

External links
Starving the Vultures on Bandcamp

1999 debut albums
Circle of Dead Children albums
Willowtip Records albums